William M. "Bill" Gannon (born October 1962) is an American politician, attorney, and businessman. A Republican, Gannon is currently serving as senator for the 23rd district of the New Hampshire Senate and was first elected in 2016. Gannon represented the 4th Rockingham district as a member of the New Hampshire House of Representatives from 2014 to 2016.

During his first term in the Senate, Gannon served as Vice Chairman of the Transportation Committee, a member of the Judiciary Committee, and a member the Executive Departments and Administration Committee. 

Gannon is currently serving his third term as senator, he is the Vice Chairman of the Senate Judiciary Committee and Chairman of the Senate Commerce Committee. Gannon’s Senate district covers twelve towns in central and Seacoast Rockingham County bordering Massachusetts.

He and his wife Janice have four children and they live in Sandown, New Hampshire. Gannon graduated with a BA from Saint Anselm College and a JD from University of Massachusetts School of Law. He is an attorney and the owner of a small construction business.

References

Living people
Saint Anselm College alumni
Republican Party New Hampshire state senators
People from Rockingham County, New Hampshire
21st-century American politicians
University of Massachusetts alumni
Republican Party members of the New Hampshire House of Representatives
1962 births